John Cyril Campbell was an English athlete and football coach, the first of Panathinaikos (at that time Podosfairikos Omilos Athinon -  Football Club of Athens).

Sources
Sifis Votzakis, 100 years Panathinaikos, Livani, 2008

English businesspeople
English footballers
Greek people of English descent
Panathinaikos F.C. managers
Panathinaikos F.C. players
Panathinaikos A.O.
Panathinaikos fencers
Alumni of the University of Oxford
Year of birth missing
Year of death missing
Association footballers not categorized by position